Plane(s) most often refers to:
 Aero- or airplane, a powered, fixed-wing aircraft 
 Plane (geometry), a flat, 2-dimensional surface
 Plane (mathematics), generalizations of a geometrical plane

Plane or planes may also refer to:

Biology
 Plane (tree) or Platanus, wetland native plant
 Planes (genus), marsh crabs in Grapsidae
 Bindahara phocides, the plane butterfly of Asia

Maritime transport
 Planing (boat), where weight is predominantly supported by hydrodynamic lift
 Plane (wherry), a Norfolk canal boat, in use 1931–1949

Music
"Planes", a 1976 song by Colin Blunstone
"Planes (Experimental Aircraft)", a 1989 song by Jefferson Airplane from Jefferson Airplane
"Planez", originally "Planes", a 2015 song by Jeremih
"The Plane", a 1987 song on the Empire of the Sun soundtrack
"The Plane", a 1997 song by Kinito Méndez

Other entertainment
Plane (Dungeons & Dragons), any fictional realm of the D&D roleplaying game's multiverse  
Planes (film), a 2013 animation
Planes: Fire & Rescue, a 2014 sequel
 Plane (film), a 2023 film
Plane (Magic: The Gathering), any fictional realm of the multiverse the card game is set in

Places
 Plane (Han Pijesak), Republika Srpska, Bosnia and Herzegovina
 Plane, Tuzla, Bosnia and Herzegovina
 Plane (river), eastern Germany
 Plane Island, off Cape Farina, Tunisia
 Pláně, Czech Republic
 Planès, France
 Planes, Alicante, Spain

Religion
 Plane (esotericism), a state, level or region of reality
 Planē (mythology), an ancient Greek goddess

Technology
 Plane (tool), a tool for shaping wood
 Plane (Unicode), in the Universal Coded Character Set, a continuous group of 216 code points
 Plane, part of a telecommunications network structure

See also

 Plain (disambiguation)
 Planar (disambiguation)
 Plano (disambiguation)
 Plane sailing, an approximate method of navigation